The Schweriner Volkszeitung (SVZ) is a newspaper in Germany. The controlling company, Zeitungsverlag Schwerin GmbH & Co. KG, has its head office in Schwerin, Mecklenburg-Vorpommern. The paper was a regional media outlet of the ruling party, Socialist Unity Party of Germany, in the East Germany. During this period the editor-in-chief was Hans Mahle.

See also

 Norddeutsche Neueste Nachrichten

References

External links
 Schweriner Volkszeitung (Mobile)

Daily newspapers published in Germany
German-language communist newspapers
Publications with year of establishment missing
Schwerin
Mass media in East Germany
Former state media